Sir John Kingsmill Robert Thorp, CMG, MBE (13 June 1912 – 13 August 1961) was a British colonial administrator. He was Governor of Seychelles from 1958 until his death in 1961.

The elder son of Samuel R. Thorp, of Tullow, County Carlow, and Mary (née Williams), of Mallow, County Cork, John Thorp was educated at Campbell College, Belfast and Trinity College, Dublin, where he was elected a foundation scholar in 1932 and took first-class moderatorship and the gold medal in Mental and Moral Science in 1933. He was Lecturer in Logic at Trinity College in 1934.

Thorp joined the Colonial Administrative Service and, after attending the Colonial Service Course at the University of Cambridge, was posted to Kenya in 1935 as a cadet, and served in the Kitui, Machakos, Turkana, Mombasa, Digo, Isiolo, Marsabit, Fort Hall and Nandi districts.

Thorp died by drowning at Grand'Anse Mahé on 13 August 1961, along with the Financial Secretary, Maurice Boullé.

References 

 https://www.ukwhoswho.com/view/10.1093/ww/9780199540891.001.0001/ww-9780199540884-e-53101
 https://www.pfsr.org/history-of-seychelles/the-colonial-governors-of-seychelles-1903-1976/
 http://www.seychellesnewsagency.com/articles/7019/Island+history++British+governors+who+led+Seychelles+through+the+th+century

Governors of British Seychelles
British colonial governors and administrators in Asia
1912 births
1961 deaths
Alumni of Trinity College Dublin
Deaths by drowning